Ezekiel 6 is the sixth chapter of the Book of Ezekiel in the Hebrew Bible or the Old Testament of the Christian Bible. This book contains the prophecies attributed to the prophet/priest Ezekiel, and is one of the Books of the Prophets. The high places in the mountains of Israel, "the seats of her idolatry", are the focus of Ezekiel's prophecies in this chapter.

Text
The original text was written in the Hebrew language. This chapter is divided into 14 verses.

Textual witnesses
Some early manuscripts containing the text of this chapter in Hebrew are of the Masoretic Text tradition, which includes the Codex Cairensis (895), the Petersburg Codex of the Prophets (916), Aleppo Codex (10th century), Codex Leningradensis (1008).

There is also a translation into Koine Greek known as the Septuagint, made in the last few centuries BC. Extant ancient manuscripts of the Septuagint version include Codex Vaticanus (B; B; 4th century), Codex Alexandrinus (A; A; 5th century) and Codex Marchalianus (Q; Q; 6th century).

Summary
Ezekiel 6:1-7: A remnant shall be saved, but the high places, altars and sun-images will be utterly destroyed
Ezekiel 6:8-10: The prophet is directed to lament their abominations and calamities, but the remnant will escape
Ezekiel 6:11-14: Emphasizing again the prophecies in chapter 5.

Verse 4
 "Then your altars shall be desolate,
 your incense altars shall be broken,
 and I will cast down your slain men before your idols." (NKJV)

The term used is "an opprobrious or contemptuous epithet, applied to idols, though its precise meaning is doubtful".

See also
Diblah
Israel
Son of man
Related Bible parts: Leviticus 26, Isaiah 5, Ezekiel 5

Notes

References

Sources

External links

Jewish
Ezekiel 6 Hebrew with Parallel English
Ezekiel 6 Hebrew with Rashi's Commentary

Christian
Ezekiel 6 English Translation with Parallel Latin Vulgate

06